The Asian Baseball Championship is the main championship tournament between national baseball teams in Asia, governed by the Baseball Federation of Asia (BFA). It is held every other year in odd-numbered years and since 1983 it also functions as the qualification games for the Baseball at the Summer Olympics if the event year is exactly one year before the Olympics. In even-numbered years, the Asian Baseball Cup is held, to determine two qualifiers — one from the Eastern Division and one from the Western Division — to join teams from China, Taiwan, Japan, and South Korea. The competition has been dominated by teams from Japan, South Korea and Taiwan.

Results

Medal table

See also
Asia Series
Baseball awards#Asia

References

External links
Asian Baseball Championship (on Baseball Federation of Asia website)

 
International baseball competitions in Asia
Baseball_Championship
Recurring sporting events established in 1954
1954 establishments in Asia